His Life's Match (Swedish: Hans livs match) is a 1932 Swedish comedy film directed by Per-Axel Branner and starring Georg Blomstedt, Björn Berglund and Sigurd Wallén.

The film's sets were designed by the art director Arne Åkermark.

Cast

References

Bibliography 
 Qvist, Per Olov & von Bagh, Peter. Guide to the Cinema of Sweden and Finland. Greenwood Publishing Group, 2000.

External links 
 

1932 films
Swedish comedy films
1932 comedy films
1930s Swedish-language films
Films directed by Per-Axel Branner
Swedish black-and-white films
1930s Swedish films